Abetti is a lunar impact crater that has been completely submerged by mare lavas. It forms a 'ghost crater' in the surface, showing only a curved rise where the rim is located. Abetti is located near the southeast edge of Mare Serenitatis, to the west of the Mons Argaeus. This crater is generally visible only at low angles of illumination. It is named after two Italian astronomers, Antonio Abetti and his son Giorgio.

References

External links

 

Impact craters on the Moon